"Mahaloha" is Yuna Ito's first collaboration single, and her 8th in total.  Micro from Def Tech provided guest vocals.  The single was released on June 27, 2007 under Studioseven Recordings.  The song was described as “very Hawaiian” by Ito, and should “let everyone outside of Hawaii feel the wind of the island”.  Mahaloha charted at #5 on Oricon's Weekly Single Charts, making it Ito's first Top Five single since her 2006 hit "Precious".

Track list 
 Mahaloha 
 Shining On 
 Stuck on You: Reggae Disco Rockers Kiss & Tell Remix
 Mahaloha: Instrumental

Music video 

It features Ito on a bench and walking on the side of a beach while singing the song, as well as laughing and joking around with Micro, as well as sitting together in a garden watching the sun set. Micro is shown sitting on a back of the truck and handling a surfboard. Both joke and sing along.

Charts

Oricon Sales Chart (Japan)

Performances
June 11, 2007 - Hey!Hey!Hey! - with Micro
June 22, 2007 - Music Station - with Micro

2007 singles
Yuna Ito songs
2007 songs